The 2006 Pepsi 400 was a NASCAR Nextel Cup Series event held on July 1, 2006, at Daytona International Speedway in Daytona Beach, Florida. Tony Stewart, driver of No. 20 Joe Gibbs Racing Chevrolet, won the race after starting second to Boris Said, and led 86 of the 160 laps. Actor Brandon Routh was the grand marshal.

Qualifying

Race summary
The race began at 8:18 p.m. with Stewart passing Said to lead the first lap. The first seven laps were run caution-free before a beach ball was found on the back straightaway. On lap 16, Jeff Burton and Casey Mears, who had had a previous incident in an earlier practice session, made contact, spinning Burton out and bringing out the caution. By the time the green flag was waved again on lap 21, Jeff Gordon had assumed the lead. Gordon continued to lead until lap 33, when he was passed by Stewart who led the race until the caution came back out for debris. Most of the leaders came to pit road; however, Dale Earnhardt Jr. did not, and thus took the lead from Stewart. Stewart would not lead again until lap 111, when he took the lead from Matt Kenseth. On lap 148, Jimmie Johnson and Bobby Labonte crashed, ending Labonte's race. Said stayed out of the pits on lap 150, giving him the lead. With six laps remaining, Gordon was involved in a crash with Greg Biffle, J. J. Yeley, and Mark Martin, bringing out the caution for the final time. Said led the field back to the green flag with three laps remaining, but was passed by Stewart on the next lap. Stewart would subsequently win the race, his second consecutive Pepsi 400 win after winning the race in 2005 as well.

Race results

References

Pepsi 400
Pepsi 400
NASCAR races at Daytona International Speedway
July 2006 sports events in the United States